Robert Point is a rocky point at the end of a small peninsula projecting 2.7 km into Bransfield Strait from the southeast coast of Robert Island in the South Shetland Islands, Antarctica to form the east side of the entrance to Devesil Bight.

The feature, which probably was known to the 19th century sealers, takes its name from the island.

Location

See also
 Robert Island
 South Shetland Islands

Maps
 L.L. Ivanov. Antarctica: Livingston Island and Greenwich, Robert, Snow and Smith Islands. Scale 1:120000 topographic map.  Troyan: Manfred Wörner Foundation, 2009.

References
 SCAR Composite Antarctic Gazetteer.

Headlands of Robert Island